Hamid Berhili (born May 14, 1964) is a retired male boxer from Morocco, who twice competed for his North African country at the Summer Olympics: 1992 and 1996. He is best known for winning the bronze medal in the men's light flyweight division (– 48 kg) at the 1995 World Amateur Championships in Berlin, Germany.

1992 Olympic record
Below is the Olympic record of Hamid Berhili, a flyweight boxer from Morocco, who competed at the 1992 Barcelona Olympics:

 Round of 32: lost to Jesper Jensen (Denmark) on points, 10-4

References
 Hamid Berhili's profile at Sports Reference.com

1964 births
Living people
Light-flyweight boxers
Boxers at the 1992 Summer Olympics
Boxers at the 1996 Summer Olympics
Olympic boxers of Morocco
Moroccan male boxers
AIBA World Boxing Championships medalists
21st-century Moroccan people
20th-century Moroccan people